Stockport County Football Club, a professional association football club based in Stockport, Greater Manchester, England, was founded in 1883 as Heaton Norris Rovers, they were renamed Stockport County in 1890 after the County Borough of Stockport. They joined The Combination for the 1891–92 season, and after three seasons they joined the Lancashire League in 1894. After six seasons in the Lancashire League, Stockport were elected to play in the Football League in 1900 and were placed in the Second Division. After failing to be re-elected into the Football League in 1904 they joined the Lancashire Combination for one season before re-joining the Football League. During their time in the Football League Stockport were relegated and promoted within in various divisions on 14 occasions, with the club achieving their highest league placing after finishing in 8th place of the 1997–98 Football League First Division, when it was the second level of the English football league system. Stockport were relegated to the Conference National after finishing bottom of the League Two in the 2010–11 season, ending 106 years of Football League membership. After 11 seasons in non-League football, Stockport were champions of the 2021–22 National League and were promoted into EFL League Two.

Stockport County's furthest FA Cup run has seen them reach the fifth round on three occasions in 1934–35, 1949–50 and 2000–01. The furthest they have reached in the EFL Cup is the semi-finals in the 1996–97 edition. The club first participated in the EFL Trophy in 1983 when it was named the Associate Members' Cup; they were the runners-up in 1992 and 1993. Stockport entered four editions of the Football League Third Division North Cup between 1933 and 1937, winning the trophy in the 1934–35 season. After their exit from the Football League in 2011 Stockport were eligible to take part in the FA Trophy, their furthest run in this competition is reaching the semi-final on two occasions in 2018–19 and 2021–22.

Key

Key to divisions
 Combination – The Combination
 Lancashire – Lancashire League
 Lanc Comb – Lancashire Combination
 Division 1 – Football League First Division
 Division 2 – Football League Second Division
 Division 3 – Football League Third Division
 Division 3N – Football League Third Division North 
 Division 4 – Football League Fourth Division
 League 1 – Football League One
 League 2 – Football League Two
 Conference – Football Conference
 Conference N – Conference North
 National – National League
 National N – National League North

Key to rounds
 PR – Preliminary round
 QR1 – First qualifying round, etc.
 R1 – First round, etc.
 R1(N) – First round Northern section, etc.
 QF – Quarter-finals
 QF(N) – Quarter-final Northern section
 SF – Semi-finals
 SF(N) – Semi-final Northern section
 RU – Runners-up
 RU(N) – Runners-up Northern section
 W – Winner

Key to positions and symbols
  – Champions
  – Runners-up
  – Promoted
  – Relegated
  – Top or joint-top league scorer in Stockport's division
  – Stockport did not enter the competition

Seasons

Notes

References
General
 
 

Specific

 
Stockport County